The Bezirk Potsdam was a district (Bezirk) of East Germany. The administrative seat and the main town was Potsdam.

History
The district was established, with the other 13, on 25 July 1952, substituting the old German states. After 3 October 1990 it was disestablished following German reunification, becoming again part of the state of Brandenburg.

Geography

Position
The Bezirk Potsdam was the largest Bezirk in the GDR and the only one bordering with West Berlin.  In addition, it bordered with East Berlin and the Bezirke of Schwerin, Neubrandenburg, Frankfurt (Oder), Cottbus, Halle and Magdeburg.

Subdivision
The Bezirk was divided into 15 Kreise: 2 urban districts (Stadtkreise) and 15 rural districts (Landkreise): 
Urban districts : Brandenburg an der Havel; Potsdam.
Rural districts : Belzig; Brandenburg; Gransee; Jüterbog; Königs Wusterhausen; Kyritz; Luckenwalde; Nauen; Neuruppin; Oranienburg; Potsdam; Pritzwalk; Rathenow; Wittstock; Zossen.

References

Potsdam
Bezirk Potsdam
20th century in Brandenburg
History of Potsdam
 Brandenburg an der Havel